David Anthony O'Leary (born 2 May 1958) is a football manager and former player. His managerial career began at Leeds United, subsequently managing Aston Villa. He most recently worked as the manager of Al-Ahli Dubai. The majority of his 20-year playing career was spent as a central defender at Arsenal. O'Leary's tally of 722 appearances for the North London side stands as a club record.

Club career
O'Leary was born in Stoke Newington, London, on 2 May 1958, and moved to live in Dublin at the age of four.

Arsenal
A Shelbourne schoolboy player, O'Leary signed for Arsenal as an apprentice in 1973. He soon progressed through the ranks at Highbury, playing in the reserves at the age of 16. He made his debut for Arsenal against Burnley on 16 August 1975, and despite being only 17, went on to make 30 appearances that season. For the next 10 years, he was ever-present in the Arsenal side, playing more than 40 matches a season (except for 1980–81, when he was injured and only played 27).

A calm and collected central defender, O'Leary was noted for his good positioning and elegant style of play. He won his first major honour with Arsenal when he played in their 3–2 win over Manchester United in the 1979 FA Cup Final. He also played in the 1978 and 1980 Cup finals, and the 1980 Cup Winners' Cup final, all of which Arsenal lost. In 1982, O'Leary became club captain, but relinquished it to Graham Rix 18 months later.

O'Leary broke numerous appearance records at Arsenal; he was the youngest person to reach the 100- and 200-match milestones, and he made his 400th appearance while still only 26. He passed George Armstrong's all-time record of 621 first-team games in November 1989. By this time, O'Leary was no longer automatic first choice (with the partnership of Tony Adams and Steve Bould at the centre of George Graham's defence), but he still turned in over 20 appearances as Arsenal won the 1988–89 First Division title due to a 2–0 win at Anfield on the final day of the season.

O'Leary won another league title in 1991 and an FA Cup and League Cup double in 1993, though by this time he was mainly used as a substitute. He holds Arsenal's all-time record for appearances, with 722 first-team games, in a 20-year-long association with the club. In a poll to compile the list of the club's greatest-ever players, O'Leary was voted 14th. O'Leary assumes the role of a club ambassador for Arsenal.

Leeds United
O'Leary joined Leeds on a free transfer in 1993 after 19 years at Highbury. O'Leary played in the Leeds side until he suffered an achilles' tendon injury. He was still on the club's payroll at the beginning of the 1995–96 season, but that September, he gave in to his injury and announced his retirement from football at the age of 37, after only 14 appearances in all competitions.

International career
O'Leary's international debut with the Republic of Ireland came as a teenager in a 1–1 draw with England in 1976. Following the appointment of Jack Charlton, O'Leary was frozen out of the international setup for 2 years. After being left out of a squad for a mini tournament in Iceland in May 1986, O'Leary booked a family holiday, which he decided not to cancel when he was eventually asked up to the squad following several withdrawals. O'Leary did not feature until November 1988, thus missing out on Euro 88.
The highlight of his 68-cap international career came in the 1990 World Cup. With Ireland in a penalty shootout with Romania, Packie Bonner saved Daniel Timofte's last penalty. O'Leary then stepped up to take the decisive final penalty to win the shootout 5–4 to take Ireland to the quarterfinals. O'Leary's strike has since been voted as the greatest moment in Irish footballing history.

Shortly after the World Cup, O'Leary scored his only goal for the Republic of Ireland in a 5–0 win over Turkey in a Euro 92 qualifier.

Managerial career
When the former Arsenal manager George Graham was put in charge at Leeds United in September 1996, O'Leary was installed as his assistant. He remained in this position for two years.

Leeds United
The Leeds United board offered several candidates the manager's position following George Graham's departure, but these deals fell through. During this time, O'Leary successfully acted as caretaker manager and was subsequently promoted to manager.

At the end of the 1998–1999 season, Leeds finished fourth in the Premier League and qualified for the UEFA Cup. Their 1999-2000 UEFA Cup campaign ended in the Cup semifinal with defeat to the Turkish side Galatasaray, following the murders of two Leeds fans during violence the night before.
On the domestic front, Leeds finished third in the Premier League and qualified for the Champions League. It was their first campaign at this level since the 1992–93 season. During this time, O'Leary endorsed a Game Boy Color computer game entitled O'Leary Manager 2000, which was released by Ubi Soft in 2000.

Leeds reached the semifinals of the Champions League in 2000-01, where they lost to eventual runners-up Valencia. Their Premier League form also dipped slightly and O'Leary's men had to settle for a UEFA Cup place, finishing fourth in the last season before the Champions League qualification spots for the English Premiership expanded from the top three to the top four. Although there was little indication of this at the time, this was a serious failure for the club because Peter Ridsdale had borrowed £60 million against future gate receipts, budgeting for prolonged Champions League involvement.

The 2001–02 season began well for Leeds. They frequently topped the table during the first half of the season and were Premier League leaders on 1 January 2002, but a loss of form in the second half of the season had them slump into fifth place, again just outside the Champions League qualification spots, meaning that they would again have to settle for a UEFA Cup place.

This period was thrown into turmoil by the involvement of four players, including first-teamers Jonathan Woodgate and Lee Bowyer, in an incident in Leeds city centre that ended in the assault and injury of an Asian student in January 2000, with the second trial ending in December 2001. O'Leary, to some extent, alienated the fans and also Ridsdale, by writing a book, Leeds United on Trial.

By June 2002, O'Leary had spent almost £100 million on new players in less than four years for no reward in terms of trophies, but he had never finished outside the top five as a manager. Ridsdale sacked O'Leary as Leeds manager in the summer of 2002, replacing him with Terry Venables. O'Leary's departure signalled a downhill spiral for the club – highly attributable to the financial state that saw the sale of several key players, which saw three more managers (Venables, Peter Reid, and Eddie Gray) come and go before the club was finally relegated from the Premier League in 2004 with £80 million debt, and fell into League One (the third tier of the league) three years later. This fall from grace led to the phrase "doing a Leeds".

O'Leary's fame at Leeds rests upon his promotion of a series of younger players, Jonathan Woodgate, Lee Bowyer, Alan Smith, Harry Kewell, Stephen McPhail, Eirik Bakke, Ian Harte, and Danny Mills (signed for £4 million from Charlton Athletic). He promoted several members of the youth team into an exciting Leeds side that played a pressing game relying on youthful enthusiasm.

In an interview regarding the decline of Leeds, O'Leary stated, "I never wanted to leave Leeds. The fans are fantastic to me here. I hope they stay up because I had great times at the club."

O'Leary has since stated that he would like the chance to return as manager of Leeds United, after Peter Ridsdale left the club.

Aston Villa
O'Leary was linked with various other vacant manager's jobs throughout the 2002–03 season. He was hot favourite to become manager of Sunderland when Peter Reid was sacked in October and again when Howard Wilkinson was sacked in March of that season, but O'Leary remained out of work until June 2003, when he was appointed manager of Aston Villa.

By the beginning of November 2003, Aston Villa were hovering just above the relegation zone. O'Leary's team finished in sixth place – one place too low for European qualification due to Millwall's FA Cup Final appearance and Middlesbrough's League Cup triumph.

2004–05
In 2004–05, Villa finished 10th in the league, a drop from the previous season. Despite this, O'Leary once again avoided any risk of relegation and signed A.C. Milan's international defender Martin Laursen, Carlton Cole, and French midfielder Mathieu Berson.

2005–06
Despite six summer acquisitions including Milan Baroš and Kevin Phillips, a series of poor results had Villa hovering dangerously above the relegation zone going into December, with just 17 points from 17 games. However, an improved winter period had them move slightly up the league, with victories over Everton (4–0), Middlesbrough (4–0) and a point against runaway leaders Chelsea. In the end, Villa finished 16th, just two places above the relegation zone. Following the relegation of local rivals Birmingham City and West Bromwich Albion, Villa were the only Midlands side playing Premier League football in 2006–07.

On 19 July 2006, O'Leary's contract as Aston Villa manager was terminated by mutual consent. Chairman Doug Ellis sold the club within a few months to Randy Lerner, and Martin O'Neill was appointed as manager.

Al-Ahli
O'Leary returned to management on 4 July 2010 with United Arab Emirates club Al-Ahli Dubai, where his first decision was to install former Italy captain Fabio Cannavaro as the new skipper of the team.
On 2 April 2011, O'Leary was relieved of his duties following a 5-1 defeat at the hands of Al Jazira. On 22 April 2011, Al-Ahli officially announced its decision to sack O'Leary with his assistant coach Roy Aitken. When he was sacked, O'Leary had two years remaining on a three-year contract. In March 2012, he asked FIFA for help in getting compensation from Al-Ahli for the early termination of his contract. In May 2013, he won $5.2 million (£3.34 million) compensation. The dispute was settled by FIFA's players' status committee. Al-Ahli claimed O'Leary had abandoned his post, despite previously stating he had been dismissed. O'Leary had won six of his 15 league games in charge.

Personal life
O'Leary's father was an avid Arsenal supporter who had left Ireland to work in London as a contractor, and was later proud that his son chose Arsenal instead of Manchester United, who had also offered him terms to sign for them. He explained his decision in 2022 to interviewer Adrian Chiles, as a guest on BBC R5 Live. O'Leary is a UK resident according to current UK Companies House documents, and maintains links to Yorkshire. He has been married to wife Joy for more than forty years. In 2002 she was the subject to hate mail during a failed CPS prosecution of two Leeds football players. The couple have two children together.

O'Leary's brother, Pierce, played for Shamrock Rovers and Celtic, and was capped seven times for the Republic of Ireland. His nephew, Ryan, declined to play for the Republic of Ireland Under 21s, choosing to play for Scotland, the country of his birth.

O'Leary was involved in a complex tax avoidance scheme, O'Leary v. McKinlay (Inspector of Taxes), that was struck down in the Chancery Court in December 1990. The scheme involved the loan of £266,000 by Arsenal, O'Leary's club, to trustees in Jersey, where it was held for his benefit.

Playing statistics

Club

International

Managerial statistics

 Al-Ahli: Only league games

Honours

Player
Arsenal
Football League First Division: 1988–89, 1990–91
FA Cup: 1978–79, 1992–93
Football League Cup: 1986–87, 1992–93
FA Charity Shield: 1991 (shared)

Individual
 PFA First Division Team of the Year: 1978–79, 1979–80, 1981–82

Manager
Individual
Premier League Manager of the Month: March 1999, March 2001, April 2001

See also
 List of Republic of Ireland international footballers born outside the Republic of Ireland

References

External links

 
 
 Full Managerial Stats for Leeds United at WAFLL
 

1958 births
Living people
Footballers from Stoke Newington
Republic of Ireland association footballers
Association football defenders
Stella Maris F.C. players
Arsenal F.C. players
Leeds United F.C. players
English Football League players
Premier League players
FA Cup Final players
Republic of Ireland international footballers
1990 FIFA World Cup players
Republic of Ireland expatriate association footballers
Irish expatriate sportspeople in England
Expatriate footballers in England
Republic of Ireland football managers
Leeds United F.C. non-playing staff
Leeds United F.C. managers
Aston Villa F.C. managers
Premier League managers
UAE Pro League managers
Republic of Ireland expatriate football managers
Irish expatriate sportspeople in the United Arab Emirates
Expatriate football managers in England
Expatriate football managers in the United Arab Emirates